John Marsh may refer to:

Politicians
John Marsh (MP fl. 1394–1397), MP for Bath
John Marsh (MP fl. 1414–1421), MP for Bath
John Allmond Marsh (1894–1952), Canadian Member of Parliament
John Otho Marsh Jr. (1926–2019), American congressman and Secretary of the Army

Association football
John Marsh (footballer, born 1922), known as Jack, English footballer
John Marsh (footballer, born 1940), English footballer
John Marsh (footballer, born 1947), known as Jack, English footballer
John Marsh (footballer, born 1948), known as Jackie, English footballer

Others
John Marsh (died 1688/1689), of Hartford, son-in-law of John Webster
John Marsh (1611–1674), of Salem, son-in-law of Samuel Skelton
John Marsh (composer) (1752–1828), English  composer, diarist and writer
John Marsh (minister) (1788–1868), American minister and temperance advocate
John Marsh (pioneer) (1799–1856), American pioneer and early California settler
John Fitchett Marsh (1818–1880), English solicitor, official and antiquary 
John Marsh (priest) (born 1947), British Anglican clergyman
Jon Marsh, musician in The Beloved
Jack Marsh (1874–1916), Australian cricketer
John Marsh, CFO of ESS Technology

See also 
Jonathan Marsh (1621–1672), founding settler of the New Haven Colony, and of Norwalk, Connecticut